is a Japanese fantasy manga series written by Anastasia Shestakova and illustrated by Crimson. The series is a re-imagining of the console wars between Sega and Nintendo featuring characters inspired by video games. An anime adaptation by 5th Avenue began airing in Japan on October 20, 2012.

Plot
A parody of the console wars, the series tells the story of two nations, the Segua Kingdom and Ninteldo Empire, locked in a struggle for dominance over the land of Consume. After years of war, the Segua Kingdom is on the defensive until a boy named Gear appears boasting of his incredible speed and powers, but what he does not know is that another person out there is more powerful than he is.

Characters

All of the characters are inspired by characters from various video game franchises.

Consume continent

Segua Kingdom

 A young man from Marcthree Village who possesses incredible speed. When he was young, his father left him to fight in the war; following the death of his friend Til, he too joins the Segua Army in order to get revenge against the Ninteldo Empire. His father is shown to be General Alex, Segua's strongest killer. He is based on the title character from the Sonic the Hedgehog series and named after the Game Gear console.

 A young girl with pointy ears who is Gear's childhood friend. After her parents were killed in the Marcthree massacre, she was taken in by Gear and Til. She thinks of Gear as her older brother. Nel is based on Nei from Phantasy Star II.

 Gear's best friend who was killed by Ninteldo soldiers, prompting Gear to get revenge. He is based on Tails from the Sonic the Hedgehog series.

An archer who is the second strongest in the Segua Special Forces. She prides herself on never missing with her arrows. She starts to fall in love with Gear after he shows her his true nature and strength. Opal is based on Opa-Opa from the Fantasy Zone series.

The lieutenant general of the Segua Army. She is based on the Columns game.

Gear's father, and general of the Segua Army who is considered the strongest killer. He is based on the title character from the Alex Kidd series.

Gear's mother, and General Alex's wife.

The 5th queen of Segua Kingdom.

Satanna's royal guard captain.

The former king of Segua Kingdom, and Satanna's father.

Ninteldo Empire

 The moustached general and emperor of the Ninteldo Empire, who helped it gain control of 90% of Consume. He is occasionally seen riding a green dinosaur named Yozu. Marcus is based on the title character from the Mario series.

One of the top soldiers of the Ninteldo Empire. He is based on Link from The Legend of Zelda series.

Marcus' younger brother, the prince of the Ninteldo Empire and a commander in the Ninteldo Army. Guliji is based on Luigi from the Mario series.

/

She is based on the Fire Emblem series.

He is based on the Mother series.

She is based on the title character from the Kirby series.

She is based on Samus Aran from the Metroid series.

He is based on Fox McCloud from the Star Fox series.

The original Ninteldo general who possesses extraordinary strength. He is based on the title character from the Donkey Kong series.

Kusamura
It is a region south of Ninteldo, where a family of 151 siblings lives.

She is based on Pikachu from the Pokémon series.

Lead daughter of the 151 siblings.

Illegal pirates

Slovia

The supreme queen of the Slovia Kingdom. She is based on the crystals from the Final Fantasy series.

Babido Republic

Decolian

Tatoland/Tatrand

A strong warrior of Tatrand. He is based on Bub and Bob from the Bubble Bobble series.

The legendary invader that had invaded Consume continent.

Puzzle magical academy/Puzzle Academy
It is a school located at southwest end of the Consume continent.

Other continent
It is a continent north of Consume continent.

Rug Federation
It is a land with extremely cold weather. The currency is ruble.

A mercenary from the island of Lorgue who was once Ramses' upperclassman at the Puzzle Academy. He is able to produce magical barriers and has a tendency to make various dirty jokes. He is based on the Tetris game.

Media

Manga
The original manga by Anastasia Shestakova and illustrated by Crimson began release on Red Road's mobile service from 2007. Nine tankōbon volumes have been released as of 2012. Seven Seas Entertainment has licensed the series for release in North America. The first volume was released in Summer of 2013.

Complete version was published by Micro Magazine.

Volume list (doujin edition)

Volume list (complete edition)

Anime
An anime adaptation was produced by 5th Avenue. The first episode was aired on Tokyo MX from October 20, 2012 and was also simulcast by Crunchyroll. Episode 2 aired on December 27, 2012, and episode 3 aired on April 4, 2013. On September 11, 2016, Media Blasters announced that they would dub and distribute the series. On January 11, 2017, Toku announced that it will premiere the World War Blue anime series in February. Later that month, was announced to begin on February 6.

Episode list

References

External links
Official (doujin series) website 
Micro Magazine (complete edition) website 
Micro Magazine (TV series) website 
Seven Seas Entertainment page

original story verification blog 

2007 manga
2012 anime television series debuts
Anime series based on manga
Fantasy anime and manga
Japanese webcomics
Manga based on video games
Anime television series based on video games
Media Blasters
Seven Seas Entertainment titles
Parody television series
Shōnen manga